Buak Hat Public Park is a public park located in the southwest corner of Chiang Mai’s old city.
It is open every day from 0500 - 2100.

Beautifully landscaped with ponds, bridges, lush flowerbeds, fountains, and wide lawn areas, Suan Buak Hat is perfect for exercise, play, and photography.
 
It is a very famous place for local people and tourists to visit and is a location for many of Chiang Mai’s festivals such as the Flower Festival.

The full name is 'suan satarana nong buak hat' - the first part means 'garden public' and the name: หนอง บวก หาด 'nong buak hat' can translate as 'marsh improved [to] beach' - this was probably a part of the city that collected all the water, so it became a park. The final sound is a 'd', but there is a slight 'r' before it. The sign over the entrance has the English transliteration as "Hard." Variations range from 'hat,' 'haad,' or 'had.'

Activity
People of all age groups usually spend their holidays easing at Buak Hat Public Park. It is a very popular place for a family trip.
 
There are many activities that can be done in the park such as:
 
Jogging: The park's perimeter is 440m [0.3 miles], a convenient distance for running practice. 
Weightlifting: All along the perimeter path are sturdy devices for exercise, and in the northeast corner is a modern, covered area with weights, benches and a sand floor.
Sepak Takraw: The area set aside for this ancient sport "Sepak Takraw" or simply "takraw" is always busy with players of every age and nationality enjoying this blend of hackysack, soccer, and volleyball. 

Tai Chi: Every morning around 5 am., there always is a group of elderly Chinese people doing Tai Chi meditation.
Yoga: Wide stretches of lawn make this a perfect place for yoga, and because of the many yoga schools in the area and because it's so popular, groups or individuals are here throughout the day doing their practice. 
Photography: Buak Hat Park is considered as one of the most beautiful parks in Chiang Mai. Charming settings for photography are at every turn - pose by an ornate Thai-style bridge, or lush banks of orchids, or under an arch dripping with purple wisteria.
Playground: An exciting, colorful children's playground is in the southwest corner, with lots of climbing, swings and slides for the little ones. Parents can sit in the park benches by the flowers and keep an eye on the kids at the same time. Next to the playground is a number of lofted platforms connected by stairs where people can sit on the shaded landings and enjoy the breeze and the view.  
  
Picnic: Grass mats are available to rent for a picnic on the lawn. Sit with your family by the pond while you have lunch and enjoy the view.
Massage: Authentic Thai Massage is provided in the line of shops along the north side, where you can also get snacks, cold drinks, fish food, or rent a mat. 
Coffee: Coffee, pastries, wifi, and an air conditioned area with full windows opening onto the gardens is provided at the cafe. 
Pavilion: A large, covered pavilion amid the largest pond is perfect for meetings or events.

Style
Buak Hat Public Park is designed in the style of "idealized nature" - with delightful storybook perfection. The park is embellished with countless fresh flowers of every variety. You can buy food for the pigeons or the huge koi [goldfish] swimming in the ponds. This attraction makes Buak Hat park the only ideal public park in Chiang Mai that is still popular.

Flowers
Buak Hat Public Park is at the center of the annual Flower Festival, when it becomes a magical jewel box of color and design. Walls and arches paved with orchids, and vast beds of fragrant rubrum lilies or snapdragons bedazzle the viewer and overwhelm the camera. There are also displays by landscape specialists, featuring waterfalls, patios and various schemes of garden decoration. There are stands representing gardens from neighbouring countries, and stands selling local products. 

There are many types of flower in the park such as: 
Orange Jessamine
Croton
Climbing Ylang Ylang
Ixora
Rain Tree
Tooth Blush Tree
Banyan Tree
Temple Tree

References

Parks in Thailand
Tourist attractions in Chiang Mai